Oswaldo Goeldi (31 October 1895 – 16 February 1961) was a Brazilian artist and renowned engraver. He was the son of Swiss naturalist Émil Goeldi.

Goeldi was born in Rio de Janeiro, but lived in Belém, in the state Pará, until he was 6 years old. His father was based there as director of the Museu de História Natural e Etnografia do Pará (presently the Emílio Goeldi Museum). In 1910 his family returned to Switzerland and he started his studies in Bern, and later in Zurich. After serving for a brief period in the army during the First World War, Goeldi moved to Geneva, where he was accepted at the École des Arts et Métiers. Frustrated with the academic environment, he abandoned the school after his father’s death in 1917 and began studying with artists Serge Pahnke (1875–1950) and Henri van Muyden (1860–s.d.), and later with Hermann Kümmerly, with whom he learned lithography.

In 1919 Goeldi returned to Rio de Janeiro and began a career of engraver and illustrator for popular magazines. He became attached to a group of vanguardist artists and intellectuals, such as Beatrix Reynal, Aníbal Machado (1894–1964), Otto Maria Carpeaux (1900–1978), Manuel Bandeira (1886–1968), Álvaro Moreyra (1888–1964), Ronald de Carvalho (1893–1935), Emiliano Di Cavalcanti (1897–1976) and Rachel de Queiroz (1910–2003). During this period, he worked intensely as an artist and did his first individual exposition, which was, however, poorly received by the art critics. Wounded by the criticisms, Goeldi withdrew from the artistic scene and isolated himself in the city of Niterói. Solitary, he supported himself more and more as a well known illustrator for book editions and magazines, working mainly with xylogravures. He also became estranged from his family in 1922, refusing their appeal to return to Europe. He took part in the Week of Modern Art in São Paulo that year. His first album, “10 Gravuras em Madeira” was edited in 1930, allowing Goeldi to save enough money to return to Europe in 1931. He exposed in Bern and Berlin, and visited again his great inspirators, Alfred Kubin and Hermann Kümmerli.

In the following decades, after returning to Brazil, Goeldi’s artistic prestige was strengthened, and he was accepted at the 25th Venice Bienal in 1950. He became nationally and internationally known and got his first prize, in the First International Art Bienal of São Paulo, in 1951. From 1952 until his death, Goeldi became a respected and influential art teacher in the Escola Nacional de Belas Artes.

He died on February 15, 1961, alone in his small apartment in Rio.

Goeldi's work has been exposed posthumously in more than a hundred expositions in Brazil, Argentina, France, Portugal, Switzerland and Spain.

Quote
Each trace is a piece of nerve with the vehemence of a barbarian heart ("Cada traço é um pedaço de nervo com a veemência de um coração bárbaro") - about his own work.
After his death several posthumous exhibitions have been performed with his works. Goeldi's Project was created and all collections and photographic files have been indexed in Goeldi Institute.

References

External links
 Institution Official site. Associação Artística Cultural Oswaldo Goeldi (In Portuguese).
 Official site. Projeto Goeldi (In Portuguese).

1895 births
1961 deaths
20th-century engravers
Brazilian engravers
Modern printmakers
Brazilian people of Swiss-German descent